is a Korean former Nippon Professional Baseball player and holder of the record for most hits in the Japanese professional leagues. An ethnic Korean, his birth name is Jang Hun (Hangul: 장훈, Hanja: 張勳). Harimoto has spent his life as a resident of Japan and adopted a Japanese name, but remains a Korean citizen, thus making him a Zainichi Korean. He was inducted into the Japanese Baseball Hall of Fame in 1990 and now works as a television baseball analyst.

Personal background
Harimoto's family relocated to Japan from Korea for better economic opportunities shortly before he was born, while the Korean Peninsula was under Japanese colonial rule, and settled in Hiroshima. Burns suffered in an accident at the age of four severely injured his right hand, with the middle three fingers scarred and largely useless, frozen into a curled position. This forced him to become a left-handed thrower and hitter, and to use a custom glove that fit over his damaged hand while still allowing him to catch the ball. The scarred fingers were bent in such a way that a baseball bat could be slid between them. Harimoto speaks of practicing swinging the bat as a child with only his right hand, trying to strengthen the injured limb to make it useful.

Harimoto would survive the release of an atomic bomb over Hiroshima on August 6, 1945, and has been identified as the only survivor of the bombing to play professional baseball in Japan. He survived without injuries because the family home was located in the shadow of a mountain and shielded from the blast, but lost a sister who was in the blast zone. Later in life, he would become a member of the Japanese Hibakusha Movement, a project dedicated to outlawing global nuclear weaponry, and gaining compensation for victims of their use.

Baseball career
Harimoto began his professional career with the Toei Flyers in 1959, when he was selected as rookie of the year. He was a dangerous hitter who combined both power and speed. His 3,085 career hits is the Nippon Professional Baseball record. Among Japanese-born players, Ichiro Suzuki passed Harimoto's hit total in 2009 based on his combined career in Japan and the American major leagues. Harimoto remains the only player to accumulate more than 3000 in Japan, a mark he reached with a home run on May 28, 1980, while playing for the Lotte Orions. After reaching this milestone, Harimoto was awarded the South Korean Order of Sport Merit Maengho Medal (국민훈장 맹호장; Maengho, literally Fierce Tiger), a prize for excellence in sports.

With 504 career home runs, Harimoto ranks seventh on the list of all-time leaders in Japan. After joining the Yomiuri Giants in 1976, he hit behind Sadaharu Oh in the lineup and was on deck when Oh hit his 756th home run to pass Hank Aaron's mark in America. Harimoto's 319 stolen bases gives him an unusual combination of 3,000 hits, 500 home runs, and 300 stolen bases, a set of milestones reached only by Willie Mays and Alex Rodriguez
in the American major leagues.

Post-player career
Since his retirement, Harimoto has mainly worked for Tokyo Broadcasting System (TBS) as a baseball commentator. He appears on a news program named Sunday Morning and comments on baseball and other sports.

See also
 List of Nippon Professional Baseball career hits leaders
 List of top Nippon Professional Baseball home run hitters

References

External links
 
 THE GOLDEN PLAYERS CLUB (Japanese)

1940 births
Living people
Baseball people from Hiroshima
South Korean baseball players
Nippon Professional Baseball outfielders
Toei Flyers players
Nippon Ham Fighters players
Yomiuri Giants players
Lotte Orions players
Hibakusha
Zainichi Korean people
South Korean expatriate sportspeople in Japan
Nippon Professional Baseball Rookie of the Year Award winners
Nippon Professional Baseball MVP Award winners
Japanese Baseball Hall of Fame inductees
Indong Jang clan